Peter Schneider is an American film executive, film producer and theatrical producer. He is best known for being, from 1985 to 1999, the president of Disney's feature animation department, which became known as Walt Disney Feature Animation in 1986, and was responsible for helping to turn the feature animation department around and creating some of the most critically acclaimed and highest grossing animated features that Disney released in a period that became known as the "Disney Renaissance".

He was promoted to studio chief in 1999. In 2001, Schneider left Disney to form his own theater production company. His first major production, developed in association with Michael Reno, was Sister Act which opened at the London Palladium in 2009. Peter graduated from Purdue University in 1972 with a theater degree.

Along with producer Don Hahn, Schneider produced a documentary entitled Waking Sleeping Beauty in 2009, which focused on the revival of Disney animation during the 1980s and early 1990s.

Schneider is also a world champion bridge player, having won the World Transnational Open Teams Championship in 2005. He possesses the World Bridge Federation (WBF) title of World Life Master (WLM).

References

External links
 
 

 

20th-century births
Living people
Walt Disney Animation Studios people
American chief executives
American chief executives in the media industry
American film studio executives
American contract bridge players
Chairmen of The Walt Disney Company
Disney executives
Place of birth missing (living people)
Year of birth missing (living people)